Marc Zwillinger is the founder and managing member of the Washington, D.C. based data privacy and information security law firm ZwillGen. Zwillinger has been active in the field of Internet law on issues such as encryption, data security, government access to user data, data breaches, and fantasy sports.

Career
Marc Zwillinger founded Zwillinger Genetski LLP (now ZwillGen PLLC), a boutique law firm specializing in data protection & information security, in March 2010. Prior to founding ZwillGen, Zwillinger was a partner at Sonnenschein Nath & Rosenthal in the firm's Internet, Communications & Data Protection Group where he had created the Internet, Communications and Data Protection Practice Group (originally called Information Security and Anti-Piracy). Zwillinger worked for the United States Department of Justice in the Computer Crime and Intellectual Property Section as a trial attorney from 1997-2000. Before entering the DOJ, Zwillinger was a litigation associate for Kirkland & Ellis from 1995-1997. Zwillinger started his career clerking for the Honorable Mark L. Wolf of the United States District Court, District of Massachusetts from 1994-1995.

Education
Marc earned his bachelor's degree from Tufts University in 1991, and received his law degree graduating magna cum laude from Harvard Law School in 1994.

Work with Apple
Zwillinger has represented Apple in several cases, including those brought under the 18th century All Writs Act involving government access to user data. In 2015, Zwillinger, representing Apple, contested unlocking an iPhone 5S belonging to a defendant accused of selling drugs in New York. Most notably, in 2016, Zwillinger represented Apple in the Apple vs San Bernardino case where the government tried to compel Apple to unlock the personal iPhone recovered from one of the terrorists in the San Bernardino attack. The case itself was later dropped.

Work with Yahoo
In 2008 Zwillinger represented Yahoo! over the government's efforts to force Yahoo! to comply with "surveillance orders and other types of legal process in national security investigations." Of the experience, Zwillinger said that he was proud to be one of the "lawyers who represented Yahoo in its historic challenge to the government's surveillance program in the Foreign Intelligence Surveillance Court ("FISC") and the Foreign Intelligence Court of Review ("FISCR")."

Service
Zwillinger is one of five amici curiae appointed to serve to the Foreign Intelligence Surveillance Court ("FISC"); a position stipulated under the USA Freedom Act. Amici serve staggered terms, with Zwillinger slated to serve a four-year term.

Awards
From 2007 through 2015, Zwillinger has been ranked in Chambers & Partners USA as a leading lawyer in his field of Privacy & Data Security.

References

External links
 

Lawyers who have represented the United States government
1969 births
Living people
Tufts University alumni
Harvard Law School alumni
People associated with Kirkland & Ellis